The Caudron C.60 was a French two-seat biplane of the 1920s and 1930s with a single engine and a canvas-covered fuselage. The French aircraft manufacturer Caudron developed this aircraft from the Caudron C.59. It was mainly used as a trainer aircraft.

The Caudron C.60 was used in France, Finland, Latvia, and in Venezuela.

Operational history
The 1921 Michelin Cup for the fastest time over a (3,000 km {1,860 mi) circuit of France was won by a C.60 flown by Alphonse Poiré, with a time of 37 hours.

Finland
The Finnish Air Force purchased 30 Caudron C.60s from France in 1923–1924. A further 34 aircraft were license-built in Finland  1927–1928. The Finnish Air Force had a total of 64 Caudron C.60s. The French-manufactured aircraft carried the codes 1E20–1E30 and 1F31–1F49, and later CA-20–CA-49. The Finnish-manufactured ones carried the codes CA-61–CA-94.

The aircraft were in use 1923–1936.

Operators

Finnish Air Force

French Air Force

Latvian Navy

Spanish Republican Air Force

Venezuelan Air Force

Survivors

The Finnish Aviation Museum in Vantaa has one of the Finnish-manufactured C.60s (CA-84)

Specifications (C.60)

See also

References

Further reading

 

C.060
1920s French military trainer aircraft
Biplanes
Single-engined tractor aircraft
Rotary-engined aircraft